Baiyunzong was an offshoot of Huayan Buddhism which synthesized Buddhism, Confucianism, and Taoism. It is viewed by Chan Buddhism as heresy and was banned by Emperor Ningzong of the Southern Song, Ayurbarwada Buyantu, Khan of the Yuan dynasty, and the Hongwu Emperor of the Ming dynasty. They published the Buddhist canon, the Puningzang.

See also
Heterodox teachings (Chinese law)

Notes

External links
初學記
正行集

Huayan
Heresy in Buddhism